Thies Christophersen (27 January 1918 – 13 February 1997), a farmer by upbringing, was a prominent German Holocaust denier.

Career
Christophersen was born in Kiel. A private in the Wehrmacht, he was deployed as a "special leader" by the Waffen-SS during World War II, and was stationed during this time at the pest control facility Rajsko, located three kilometres (1.9 mi) from Auschwitz concentration camp. Christophersen insisted that, staying in the area, he would have been certain to identify mass killings and claimed that he never witnessed or made aware of any such incidents.

Christophersen, who was initially a member of the CDU party, then German Party and briefly a member of Germany's Neo-Nazi NPD party, forged close contacts, both domestically and internationally, with other proponents of the "Auschwitz lie" such as Stäglich, Roeder, Udo Walendy, Robert Faurisson and Florentine Rost van Tonningen, and with Stille Hilfe ("Silent Help"), an organisation assisting neo-Nazi activists. Christophersen appeared as a witness in the trial of Ernst Zündel in Canada.

Christophersen eventually fled the country, first to Belgium, and later to Kollund in Denmark where he spent 10 years. There he established the Kollund-Verlag (Kollund Publishing House), which distributed denialist material throughout the world. He appeared in two videos, in which he claimed that it was a privilege for prisoners to be detained in Auschwitz. According to Christophersen they were treated excellently, and were given the opportunity to be deployed to work groups (in reality forced labour) appropriate to their professions.

In the film Die Auschwitz-Lüge und ihre Folgen ("The Auschwitz Lie and Its Consequences") he was interviewed by Ernst Zündel.

His brochure Die Bauernschaft ("Farming Community"), in which Christophersen disseminated further Holocaust-denying material, was seized by the authorities several times, the last being in 1994. In 1995 the distribution rights for this set of publications passed to Ernst Zündel in Canada, but he relinquished this just a year later. In the same year Christophersen settled in Switzerland, but was deported in 1996.

Christophersen died on 13 February 1997 in Molfsee near Kiel.

Christophersen and the "Auschwitz Lie"
The widely known phrase "Auschwitz lie" (German Auschwitzlüge) can be traced to Christophersen, whose 1973 book of that name disputed the existence of gas chambers at the Auschwitz concentration camp.

Along with Christophersen's own writings, that book also contains further contributions and forewords from other Holocaust deniers, including the former lawyer and convicted violent criminal Manfred Roeder (classified as a terrorist in Germany) and the former judge Wilhelm Stäglich. Since 1993 the book has been included on a list of materials that may not be distributed to young people, as ruled by Germany's Federal Department for Media Harmful to Young Persons, due to its Holocaust-denying content. The foreword by Manfred Roeder was characterised by that department as inflammatory anti-Semitic propaganda, which constitutes an infringement of Germany's Volksverhetzung law (incitement to hatred).

The book, "Auschwitz lie" (German Auschwitzlüge) was first published in German in 1973 under the title Die Auschwitz Luge. The first English edition appeared in 1974 under the title The Auschwitz Lie. In August 1979, it was published in a completely revised and supplemented new edition.

Notes

Much of this article is translated from the German wikipedia article of 5 March 2007

1918 births
1997 deaths
Writers from Kiel
People from the Province of Schleswig-Holstein
German people convicted of Holocaust denial
German Army soldiers of World War II